Ned Nelson (January 11, 1911 – October 2, 1977) was an American college baseball and basketball player.

Baseball
Nelson was elected to the University of Washington Hall of Fame in 1989. In 1931 he became the first Washington Husky to be named an All-American at first base. In addition, he led the Huskies to 3 North Division titles from 1930–1932.

Basketball
Nelson was a 3-year starter on the UW basketball team. In 1931 he rounded out the starting 5 that won Washington's first Pacific Coast Conference championship.

1911 births
1977 deaths